Chaenomugil proboscideus, the snouted mullet, is a species mullet found along the western coast of North America from Mexico to Panama. It is found in rocky, areas near the coast where it feeds on algae growing on rocks which it scrapes off using its specialized teeth. This species grows to a length of  TL.  This fish is of minor importance in local commercial fisheries, mostly in Panama.  This is the only known species in its genus.

References

Mugilidae
Monotypic fish genera